Haydarpaşa station is a railway station in Istanbul, that was, until 2012 the main city terminal for trains travelling to and from the Anatolian side of Turkey. It used to be Turkey's busiest railway station. (Its counterpart on the European side of the city was Sirkeci station which served train services to and from the Thracian side of the country.) The station building still houses the headquarters for District 1 of the State Railways but since a fire in 2010 the station has not been in use and its future remains uncertain.

Haydarpaşa stands on an embankment over the Bosphorus just south of the Port of Haydarpaşa (one of the main container terminals in Turkey) and is slightly north of busy Kadıköy. Until the rail service was suspended, ferry services connected it to Eminönü, Karaköy and Kadıköy.

The closure of the station has been very controversial and a group known as the Haydarpaşa Solidarity Group has staged regular protest sit-ins in front of it amid fears that the station and port would be sold; a plan involving seven skyscrapers provoked especially strong adverse reaction. In December 2015, the reintegration of Haydarpaşa station into the Marmaray network was theoretically approved along with the restoration and rehabilitation of the station building and platforms. However, in 2022 its future still remained unclear.

History

Ottoman era (1872–1922)
In 1871 Sultan Abdülaziz ordered the first railway line to be built from Haydarpaşa in Istanbul to İzmit. Haydarpaşa station opened in 1872, by which time the railway extended as far as Gebze. In 1888 the Anatolian Railway (Chemins de fer Ottomans d'Anatolie, CFOA) took over the line and the station. Since the station was built right beside the Bosphorus, freight trains could unload at Haydarpaşa and the freight could be transferred straight to ships. Haydarpaşa station saw its first regular passenger service - daily train from Haydarpaşa to İzmit - in 1890. In 1892 the CFOA laid a line to Ankara and shortly afterwards a daily train started to run between the two cities.

Haydarpaşa was chosen as the northern terminus for the Baghdad Railway and the Hejaz Railway in 1904, and, with rail traffic increasing, a larger building was required. The Anatolian Railway hired two German architects, Otto Ritter and Helmut Conu, to build the new building. They chose a Neo-classical design and construction started in 1906. Its foundation is based on 1100 wooden piles, each 21 metres long, driven into the soft shore by a steam hammer. German and Italian stonemasons crafted the decoration of the exterior. The work was completed on land reclaimed from the sea on 19 August 1909 and the new terminal was inaugurated on 4 November 1909 for the birthday of Mehmed V. While the work was in progress the community of German engineers and craftsmen established a small German neighbourhood with its own school in the Yeldeğirmeni quarter of Kadıköy. 

World War I broke out in 1914 and the Ottoman Empire sided with the Central Powers against the Allied Powers. When the Ottomans lost İstanbul was taken over by the British Empire and Haydarpaşa fell under British military control during the occupation.

In 1917 the architect Vedat Tek designed the pretty terminal decorated with Kütahya tiles where ferries used to deposit would-be train passengers in front of the station.

Republican era (1923–present)

The Turkish Independence War ended on 29 October 1923 with the British withdrawal from Istanbul and the formation of the Republic of Turkey. Haydarpaşa terminal was still under CFOA control but in 1927 the newly formed Turkish State Railways (TCDD) took over the CFOA and the terminal  as part of the process of nationalising all the Turkish railways. In 1927 the CIWL started a premier train service, the all-sleeper Anatolian Express, that travelled daily between Haydarpaşa and Ankara. In 1969 the tracks from Haydarpaşa to Gebze were electrified with 25 kV AC catenary for the Haydarpaşa-Gebze commuter line.

In 1979 a tanker burning on the Bosphorus damaged the terminal building, but it was restored a few months later. On 28 November 2010 a fire caused by carelessness during restoration work destroyed the station's roof and the 4th floor. Three people were sentenced to ten months in prison for "recklessly causing the fire".

In 2011 the World Monuments Fund, the New York-based heritage preservation organisation, placed the railway terminal on its 2012 Watch, drawing attention to its uncertain future. In November 2012 the station hosted a three-day art exhibition entitled Haydarpasa: Past, Present and Uncertain Future, which was organised in collaboration with the WMF, and featured Canadian and Turkish artists and photographers seeking to raise international interest in preserving the station as a transportation hub. 

On 2 February 2012 Haydarpaşa Station closed to long-distance trains to allow for the construction of the Istanbul–Ankara high-speed railway and the Marmaray which now connects Istanbul's Asian and European sides, halting train services between Istanbul and the Anatolian region of Turkey). Although work on the Marmaray has now been completed along with high-speed train services to Ankara, Konya and Eskişehir, these now leave from stations other than Haydarpaşa which remained closed and under restoration in 2022.

Archaeological excavations

In 2018, remains of a Byzantine coastal town were uncovered during restoration work on the station. The excavations also unearthed a Byzantine-era fountain, a large fortification wall and a ceramic brick kiln.Dozens of graves were also discovered; in October 2018, archaeologists found an intact skeleton wearing a scented necklace. Jewellery and coins dating back to between 610-641 and 527-565 A.D were also found. 

A podium made of sheared rectangular blocks found between the railway platforms is believed to date back to the Hellenistic era.

Service

Historic monuments in the vicinity of the station

The small Haydarpaşa Cemetery is dedicated to the British and Commonwealth soldiers who lost their lives during the Crimean War (1854–1856) and the two World Wars. It also contains the graves of members of the Levantine community who used to live in Kadıköy and Moda.

The north-west wing of the 19th-century Selimiye Barracks was transformed into a military hospital during the Crimean War and became the place where the nursing pioneer Florence Nightingale cared for wounded and infected British soldiers. Her room is maintained in a small museum which also contains other items dating from the Crimean War. Permission from the military is required before visiting the museum. 

The buildings of the Haydarpaşa Numune Hospital, GATA Military Hospital, Dr. Siyami Ersek Hospital and the present-day Haydarpaşa Campus of the Marmara University designed by architects Alexander Vallaury and Raimondo D'Aronco are also near the station.

See also
 Baghdad Railway
 Hejaz Railway
 Istanbul Sirkeci Terminal, the other major train terminal of Istanbul on the European side
 List of train stations in Turkey
 Public transport in Istanbul

References

External links

 Başkent Ekspresi
 Fatih Ekspresi
 Boğaziçi Treni
 Anadolu Ekspresi
 Ankara Ekspresi
 İç Anadolu Mavi Treni
 Meram Ekspresi
 Doğu Ekspresi
 Vangölü Ekspresi
 Transasya Ekspresi
 Güney Ekspresi
 Cumhuriyet Ekspresi
 Eskişehir Ekspresi
 Sakarya Ekspresi
 The world's most spectacular railway stations

1872 establishments in the Ottoman Empire
Historic sites in Turkey
Transport in Kadıköy
Ottoman railways
Railway stations in Istanbul Province
Railway stations opened in 1872
Railway stations opened in 1908
Railway stations closed in 2013
Ancient Greek archaeological sites in Turkey
2013 disestablishments in Turkey